Zamane Se Poocho is a 1976 Bollywood drama film directed by Abrar Alvi.

Cast
 Ambrish Kapadia
 Kader Khan
 Satyendra Kapoor
 Murad
 Faryal

Songs
"Aji Ek Sang Udaao Rang Bhigaao Ang" - Mohammed Rafi, Kishore Kumar
"Ae Ishq Kahin Le Chal Rangeen Fizaaon Mein" - Sharda
"Aapke Qarib Aapke Hi Paas" - Krishna Kalle
"Dekho Dekho Baaten Karti Main Khaamoshi Hoon" - Sharda
"Dil Mein Jo Aaya Apun Kiya" - Mohammed Rafi
"Ham Bhanvar Mein Kinaare Banaaya Karen" - Krishna Kalle
"Rootthoge Mana Loongi Badi Raat Padi Hai" - Sharda

External links

References

1976 films
1970s Hindi-language films
Indian drama films